Křelov-Břuchotín is a municipality in Olomouc District in the Olomouc Region of the Czech Republic. It has about 1,700 inhabitants.

Administrative parts
Křelov-Břuchotín is made up of villages of Křelov and Břuchotín.

History
The first written mention of Křelov is from 1275, the first mention of Břuchotín is from 1278. The two municipalities were merged in 1960 under the name Křelov. In 1975 Křelov and Břuchotín were joined to Olomouc. In 1995 it became a separate municipality under its current name.

Notable people
Ivo Viktor (born 1942), footballer

References

Villages in Olomouc District